In object-oriented programming, an interface or protocol type is a data type describing a set of method signatures, the implementations of which may be provided by multiple classes that are otherwise not necessarily related to each other. A class which provides the methods listed in a protocol is said to adopt the protocol, or to implement the interface.

If objects are fully encapsulated then the protocol is the only way in which they may be accessed by other objects. For example, in Java, the Comparable interface specifies a method compareTo() which implementing classes must implement. This means that a sorting method, for example, can sort a collection of any objects of types which implement the Comparable interface, without having to know anything about the inner nature of the class (except that two of these objects can be compared by means of compareTo()).

Some programming languages provide explicit language support for protocols (Ada, C#, D, Dart, Delphi, Go, Java, Logtalk, Object Pascal, Objective-C, OCaml, PHP, Racket, Seed7, Swift, Python 3.8). In languages supporting multiple inheritance, such as C++, interfaces are implemented as abstract classes.

In languages without explicit support, protocols are often still present as conventions. This is known as duck typing. For example, in Python, any class can implement an __iter__ method and be used as a collection.

Type classes in languages like Haskell, or module signatures in ML and OCaml, are used for many of the things that protocols are used for.

See also
 Concept (generic programming)
 Delegation (programming)
 Protocols in Objective-C
 Class (computer science)
 Encapsulation (computer science)
 Public interface
 List of basic computer science topics
 Application programming interface

Notes

References

Object-oriented programming